Emily Scarratt  (born 8 February 1990) is an English rugby union player. She currently plays centre and fullback for Loughborough Lightning and for England. She is also a qualified teacher.

Club career
Scarratt played for Leicester Forest before moving to Lichfield. In 2018 she joined Loughborough Lightning.

International career
Scarratt first played for England in 2008, scoring 12 tries in 12 games and earning comparisons to Brian O'Driscoll. In 2009 she helped England to victory in the 2009 Women's Six Nations Championship and was joint top try scorer with teammate Fiona Pocock. As England went on to win the next three Six Nations Championships, Scarratt again achieved top try scorer in 2010 and top point scorer in 2011.

In 2014, Scarratt proved to be an invaluable player to England Women, scoring 16 points in the Rugby World Cup final to help England beat Canada to the title. In addition, Scarratt ended the tournament as top points scorer with 70 points.

She not only plays in the XV's game but also for the Women's Sevens side, for whom she has scored 12 tries and played in several tournaments. In 2016, Scarratt captained Team GB in the Rugby 7's at the Olympics in Rio, finishing in 4th place. She also represented England in the 2018 Commonwealth Games in which the team took bronze, and the Rugby World Cup Sevens in the same year.

Scarratt was instrumental in the England women's team's two consecutive Grand Slams in the 2019 and 2020 Women's 6 Nations Championships.

In 2019, she was awarded the World Rugby Women's 15s Player of the Year and the Rugby Union World Player of the Year (Women's). In the same year she was also awarded a full time England contract.

In 2020, Scarratt became the highest ever England rugby points scorer during the 2020 Six Nations. She was also named Player of the Championship. She was named in the England squad for the delayed 2021 Rugby World Cup held in New Zealand in October and November 2022.

Scarratt was appointed Member of the Order of the British Empire (MBE) in the 2021 Birthday Honours for services to rugby union.

Personal life
Scarratt was born in Leicester in 1990. She played hockey, rounders and basketball at a young age and was offered a US Basketball Scholarship aged 16 but turned it down.

Scarratt was also a PE assistant at King Edward's School Birmingham, following in the footsteps of fellow England rugby international Natasha Hunt, but like many of her national teammates she left her job in order to become a full-time professional rugby player.

Honours

 RBS 6 Nations Rugby Women's winner 2009, 2010, 2011, 2012, 2019, 2020, 2021, 2022
 England Women's Rugby Player of the Year Award 2013
 2014 Women's Rugby World Cup winner
 2014 WRWC Dream Team
 2018 Commonwealth Games bronze medallist
 2019 Rugby Union World Player of the Year (Women's) 
 2020 Women's Six Nations Player of the Championship

References

External links

 
 
 
 

1990 births
Living people
Female rugby union players
English female rugby union players
Rugby sevens players at the 2016 Summer Olympics
Olympic rugby sevens players of Great Britain
Great Britain national rugby sevens team players
England women's international rugby union players
England international women's rugby sevens players
Commonwealth Games medallists in rugby sevens
Commonwealth Games bronze medallists for England
Rugby sevens players at the 2018 Commonwealth Games
Members of the Order of the British Empire
Rugby union players from Leicester
Medallists at the 2018 Commonwealth Games